Nugal may refer to:

 Nugal Beach, an all nude beach on the Makarska Riviera in Croatia
 Nugal, Somalia, a region (gobolka) of northern Somalia